Kharabanan may refer to:
 Kharabanan-e Olya
 Kharabanan-e Sofla